Leonard or Master Leonard is a demon or spirit in the Dictionnaire Infernal, grand-master of the nocturnal orgies of demons. He is represented as a three-horned goat, with a black human face. He marks his initiates with one of his horns. Infernal powers obtained from the worship of Master Leonard range from metamorphosis into monstrous animals or men to flight as an incubus.

It may be possible that the goat-like figure, Leonard, is related to the ritual described in Leviticus 16:8 concerning Azazel:
Leviticus 16:8  And Aaron shall cast lots upon the two goats; one lot for the LORD, and the other lot for the scapegoat.

9  And Aaron shall bring the goat upon which the LORD'S lot fell, and offer him for a sin offering.

10  But the goat, on which the lot fell to be the scapegoat, shall be presented alive before the LORD, to make an atonement with him, and to let him go for a scapegoat into the wilderness.

There is mention of a "Master Leonard" in the Dictionary of Phrase and Fable (published 1898) in association with the alleged deity of the Templars, the Baphomet or "Goat of Mendes". Black banquets are thrown in Leonard's honor where aborted kid goats are eaten without salt and boiled with reptiles to sully the sinless nature of the clean meat.

Leonard has been known to take other forms, and there is some connection to the legend of the werewolf; he has been known to appear as a handsome soldier, a favorite of many demons. In this form he will seduce a young lady and take her to the wilderness where he will lie with her and ejaculate cold semen. Any child resulting from this union will be stillborn, an offering for sin, again echoing loosely the story of Aaron.

Resources

 Delirium Web Site 
 A Field Guide to Demons, Fairies, Fallen Angels and Other Subversive Spirits, Carol K. Mack
 Dictionary of Phrase and Fable entry on Master Leonard 

Demons